Taiga (1992) is an eight-hour ethnographic film directed and photographed by Ulrike Ottinger.

It focuses on the life and rituals of nomadic peoples in Northern Mongolia, specifically the Darkhad nomads and the Soyon Uriankhai.

It is divided into 38 parts:

 Der Oul-Paß mit Obo-Heiligtum - Wächter zum Darkhad-Tal
 Das Tal der Darkhad-Nomaden
 Nomaden am Altrag-Fluß
 Im einsamen Höjen-Tal lebt die Schamanin Baldshir
 Die schamanistische Seance beginnt um Mitternacht
 Bei Jura - Die Hochzeit
 Bei Jura - Die weißen Speisen
 Juras Nachbarn - Der Sänger und Schmied Dawadschi
 Heiliger Baum
 Suren Hör erzählt das Märchen vom nackten Jungen im Erdloch
 Der Jäger und Stiefelmacher Ölziibajar
 Das Öwtschuunii-Naadam - Fest des Hammelbrustknochens
 Ringer und Lobpreissänger
 Aufbruch der Nomaden ins Winterlager
 Unterwegs nach Tsagaan Nor (Weißer See)
 Der Jäger Tscholoo
 Tsagaan Nor City
 Held der Arbeit
 Holzfäller Sanji
 Örgöl-Heiligtum
 Wie die Alten Bären jagten
 Auf dem Schischgid zu den Rentiernomaden der Taiga
 Großes Tsaatan-Treffen am Tingis
 Eine christliche Delegation ist gelandet
 Aufbruch ins 5 Tagereisen entfernte Herbstlager
 Reise zur südlichen Taiga
 Die Schamanin Bajar und ihre Familie
 Zurück bei Jura - Vorbereitungen fürs Winterlager
 Juras Umzug ins Winterlager nach Ulaan Uul
 Juras Nachbarn in Ulaan Uul
 Im Kaufladen sind Mehl und Teeziegel eingetroffen
 Die Honoratioren von Ulaan Uul geben ein Abschiedsfest
 Nomaden am Oul-Paß
 Erster Schultag in Hadhal
 Von Hadhal nach Hanch, zwei vergessene Handels­metropolen
 Chöwsgöl Nor - See des Klaren Wassers
 Ulaanbaatar - Hochzeitspalast
 Vergnügungspark - Epensänger

See also 
List of longest films by running time

References

Further reading

External links
 
 New York Times review

1992 films
Films directed by Ulrike Ottinger
Anthropology documentary films
German documentary films
1990s German-language films
Mongolian-language films
1992 documentary films
1990s German films